Cosmisoma scopipes is a species of beetle in the family Cerambycidae. It was described by Johann Christoph Friedrich Klug in 1852.

References

Cosmisoma
Beetles described in 1852